The year 1676 in science and technology involved some significant events.

Astronomy
 Summer – The Royal Greenwich Observatory, designed by Christopher Wren, is completed near London.
 December 7 – Danish astronomer Ole Rømer measures the speed of light by observing the eclipses of Jupiter's moons, obtaining a speed of 140,000 miles per second (approximately 25% too slow).
 Edmond Halley arrives on the island of Saint Helena, having left the University of Oxford, and sets up an astronomical observatory to catalogue stars from the Southern Hemisphere.

Biology
 Antony Van Leeuwenhoek discovers bacteria, observed with the microscope.
 Francis Willughby's Ornithologiae is published by John Ray, the foundation of scientific ornithology.

Medicine
 William Briggs publishes an anatomy of the eye (the first in England), Ophthalmographia, at Cambridge.
 Thomas Sydenham publishes the textbook , the enlarged 3rd edition of his .

Paleontology
 The first fossilised bone of what is now known to be a dinosaur is discovered in England by Robert Plot, the femur of a Megalosaurus from a limestone quarry at Cornwell near Chipping Norton, Oxfordshire.

Technology
 July 7 – The first clocks using a form of deadbeat escapement, constructed by Thomas Tompion to a design by Richard Towneley, are installed at the Royal Greenwich Observatory.

Births
 May 28 – Jacopo Riccati, Italian mathematician (died 1754)
 Caleb Threlkeld, Irish botanist (died 1728)
 Maria Clara Eimmart, German astronomer, engraver and designer  (died 1707)

Deaths
 May 25 – Johann Rahn, Swiss mathematician (born 1622)
 September 4 – John Ogilby, English cartographer (born 1600)

References

 
17th century in science
1670s in science